The 2014–15 TFF Third League (also known as Spor-Toto Third League due to sponsorship reasons) is the 14th season of the league since its establishment in 2001 as the fourth level division; and the 44th season of the third league in Turkish football since its establishment in 1967–68 (before 2001 league was played as third level division).

Group 1

Teams

League table

Promotion Playoffs

Semifinals

First legs

Second legs

Finals

Group 2

Teams

League table

Promotion Playoffs

Semifinals

First legs

Second legs

Finals

Group 3

Teams

League table

Promotion Playoffs

Semifinals

First legs

Second legs

Finals

See also
 2014–15 Turkish Cup
 2014–15 Süper Lig
 2014–15 TFF First League
 2014–15 TFF Second League

References

4
Turk
2012-13